Dictionnaire Bouillet is the informal title of the Dictionnaire universel d'histoire et de géographie ("Universal Dictionary of History and Geography"), a French reference work in the public domain. The first edition was published in 1842; the 34th and final edition was published in 1914. 
The original authors were Marie-Nicolas Bouillet (d. 1865) and Alexis Chassang (1827–78).

Neutrality of later editions
Editions after 1852 were amended, probably clandestinely and by the typographers rather than the authors, to make certain articles less offensive to Christian sensibilities. For example, for Cardinal Ximenes, the original Il était fanatique et cruel ("He was fanatical and cruel") was changed to read Il était sévère, mais juste ("He was tough but fair").  References to sales of religious indulgences were deleted entirely.

The neutrality of editions after 1842 is therefore open to question when the work touches on Christian themes.

References

External links
 

 Dictionnaire universel d'histoire et de géographie (1914) at HathiTrust 

French books
History books
Geography books